Satsuma Loans (a trading name of Provident Personal Credit) is an online-only loan provider offering short-term loans. It was launched by doorstep lender Provident Financial in 2013. Satsuma Loans charges a typical annual percentage rate of 991% , with a maximum interest rate of 1,575%.

Satsuma lends up to £1,000 to first time customers which can be borrowed over a 12-month period, incurring an interest charge of £990 on a £1,000 loan. Satsuma Loans offer fixed weekly or monthly repayment plans and claim that there are no hidden fees or charges with their loans.

Satsuma had £5 million of loans as of 2015, increasing from £1.8 million the previous year.



Sponsorship 
Between 2014 and 2016 Satsuma Loans sponsored RFU Championship side Yorkshire Carnegie in a deal worth £600,000. In 2016 it was announced that Satsuma Loans would become an official partner of Sunderland A.F.C. This prompted Sharon Hodgson, the MP for Washington and Sunderland West, to write to the club warning that associating themselves with a high-interest lender would undermine their positive community engagement work.

References

See also 
 Payday loans in the United Kingdom

Financial services companies of England